The 2020–21 Missouri State Bears basketball team represented Missouri State University during the 2020–21 NCAA Division I men's basketball season. The Bears, led by third-year head coach Dana Ford, played their home games at JQH Arena in Springfield, Missouri as members of the Missouri Valley Conference. In a season limited by the ongoing COVID-19 pandemic, they finished the season 17–7, 12–6 in MVC play to finish in third place. They defeated Valparaiso in the quarterfinals of the MVC tournament before losing to Drake in the semifinals.

Previous season 
The Bears finished the 2019–20 season 16–17, 9–9 in MVC play to finish in a tie for sixth place. They defeated Indiana State in the quarterfinals of the MVC tournament before losing in the semifinals to Valparaiso. All postseason play was thereafter canceled due to the ongoing COVID-19 pandemic.

Roster

Schedule and results

|-
!colspan=9 style=|Regular season

|-
!colspan=12 style=| MVC tournament

Source

References

Missouri State Bears basketball seasons
Missouri State
Missouri State, basketball men
Missouri State, basketball men